The Mercat Shopping Centre is located in Kirkcaldy, Fife, Scotland, United Kingdom. The Mercat has one anchor store; TK Maxx.

The shopping centre was built in two phases between 1972 and 1981–83 with a refurbishment completed in 1997.  A proposal to extend the shopping centre for a third phase is pending.
In 1996 plans to broadcast an episode of Family Fortunes live from the Mercat Centre were scrapped due to concerns that the event would not be covered by the Centre's insurance company. Les Dennis described the decision as "unfortunate, but sadly unavoidable".

The shopping centre is currently owned by Mars Pension Fund and managed by Lasalle Investment Management.

History 
Kirkcaldy Town council considered a controversial redevelopment of Kirkcaldy town centre in January 1964, which was only passed by a narrow margin, after a fiercely contested public inquiry. A plot of land situated between the High Street and the Esplanade was purchased in April 1964 for demolition as the new site of the shopping centre. Four Streets consisting of Market, Cowie, Rose and Thistle were all lost.

First phase 
Construction of the shopping centre was supposed to commence building work in Autumn 1967, but the project was delayed until the early 1970s.
Work finally began on the first phase of The Mercat in 1971 – and buildings numbered from 94–112 in the High Street including the birthplace of Adam Smith, were demolished.
This was to contain initially 29 units, a major department store and one multi-storey car park - for completion in 1972.

Second phase 
The success of the Mercat, prompted an extension which was given the green light in 1978. The extension dubbed "Mercat II" was built, alongside a second multi-storey car park, by Michael Laird and Partners between 1981 and 1983. The Car Park, despite only been two-storey, was known for presenting a deep roof, identical dormers and separated wrought-iron inserts on the wall.

References 

Kirkcaldy
Shopping centres in Fife
Shopping malls established in 1972
1972 establishments in Scotland